Cornufer macrosceles is a species of frog in the family Ceratobatrachidae. It is endemic to the island of New Britain, Papua New Guinea. It is only known from the Nakanai Mountains in the central part of the island. Only three specimens are known. Common name Ti wrinkled ground frog has been coined for the species.

Description
The original species description was based on a single specimen (the holotype, collected in 1956), a small adult female  in snout–vent length. The holotype is a small female. Two males found in 1999 measure  in snout–vent length. The overall appearance is slender. The head is moderately large and wider than the body. The snout is acutely pointed and elongate. The tympanum is visible, not concealed by the low, fleshy supratympanic fold. The fingers are slender and have greatly expanded and swollen terminal disks. The toe tips are moderately expanded. No webbing is present. The dorsal coloration is bright olive-green, with distinct brown patches on the dorsum. The venter is white. Skin is smooth apart from a few dermal tubercles on the head and the dorsum.

Habitat and conservation
Specimens have been found perched on moss-covered branches of shrub-layer vegetation, about 1 m above the ground near a small mountain stream. They were well camouflaged in this habitat.

Logging is prevalent in New Britain, but whether it is impacting the range of this species is unclear.

References

macrosceles
Amphibians of Papua New Guinea
Endemic fauna of Papua New Guinea
Taxa named by Richard G. Zweifel
Amphibians described in 1975
Taxonomy articles created by Polbot